In Greek mythology, the name Perimede (Ancient Greek: Περιμήδη "very cunning" or "cunning all round", derived from peri "round" and medea, "cunning" or "craft') refers to:

Perimede, an Argive queen as the wife of Phoroneus, king of Argos and possible mother of his children.
Perimede, a Thessalian princess as the daughter of King Aeolus of Aeolia and Enarete, daughter of Deimachus. She was the sister of Salmoneus, Athamas, Sisyphus, Cretheus, Perieres, Deioneus, Magnes, Calyce, Canace, Alcyone and Pisidice. Perimede was the mother of Hippodamas and Orestes by the river god Achelous.
Perimede, a Calydonian princess as the daughter of King Oeneus, mother of Astypalaea and Europe by Phoenix (son of Agenor).
Perimede, other name for Polymede, mother of Jason by Aeson.
Perimede, daughter of Alcaeus and granddaughter of Perseus and Andromeda. Her mother was named either Astydameia, the daughter of Pelops and Hippodamia, or Laonome, daughter of Guneus, or else Hipponome, daughter of Menoeceus. Perimede was the sister of Amphitryon and Anaxo, and wife of Licymnius by whom she became the mother of Melas, Argius and Oeonus.
Perimede, daughter of Agamemnon and Clytemnestra better known as Iphigenia.
Perimede, a witch, expert in herbs and poisons, described as "fair-haired". See Agamede.

Notes

References 

Hesiod, Catalogue of Women from Homeric Hymns, Epic Cycle, Homerica translated by Evelyn-White, H G. Loeb Classical Library Volume 57. London: William Heinemann, 1914. Online version at theio.com
 Pausanias, Description of Greece with an English Translation by W.H.S. Jones, Litt.D., and H.A. Ormerod, M.A., in 4 Volumes. Cambridge, MA, Harvard University Press; London, William Heinemann Ltd. 1918. Online version at the Perseus Digital Library
 Pausanias, Graeciae Descriptio. 3 vols. Leipzig, Teubner. 1903.  Greek text available at the Perseus Digital Library.
Pindar, Odes translated by Diane Arnson Svarlien. 1990. Online version at the Perseus Digital Library.
Pindar, The Odes of Pindar including the Principal Fragments with an Introduction and an English Translation by Sir John Sandys, Litt.D., FBA. Cambridge, MA., Harvard University Press; London, William Heinemann Ltd. 1937. Greek text available at the Perseus Digital Library.
 Pseudo-Apollodorus, The Library with an English Translation by Sir James George Frazer, F.B.A., F.R.S. in 2 Volumes, Cambridge, MA, Harvard University Press; London, William Heinemann Ltd. 1921. Online version at the Perseus Digital Library. Greek text available from the same website.
Sextus Propertius, Elegies from Charm. Vincent Katz. trans. Los Angeles. Sun & Moon Press. 1995. Online version at the Perseus Digital Library. Latin text available at the same website.
Theocritus, Idylls from The Greek Bucolic Poets translated by Edmonds, J M. Loeb Classical Library Volume 28. Cambridge, MA. Harvard University Press. 1912. Online version at theoi.com
Theocritus, Idylls edited by R. J. Cholmeley, M.A. London. George Bell & Sons. 1901. Greek text available at the Perseus Digital Library.

Aeolides
Greek mythological witches
Women in Greek mythology
Aetolian characters in Greek mythology
Thessalian characters in Greek mythology
Aetolian mythology
Thessalian mythology